Refton is an unincorporated community and census-designated place (CDP) in Strasburg Township, Lancaster County, Pennsylvania, United States, with a ZIP code of 17560. The community is located along U.S. Route 222.  As of the 2010 census the population was 298.

Geography
The community is in central Lancaster County, in the western corner of Strasburg Township. It is bordered to the northwest by Pequea Creek and to the southwest by its tributary, Big Beaver Creek. U.S. Route 222 passes through the northeast side of the community, leading north  to the center of Lancaster, the county seat, and southeast  to Quarryville.

Via Pequea Creek the community is part of the Susquehanna River watershed.

References

Populated places in Lancaster County, Pennsylvania